This is a list of flags associated with Armenia.

National flags

President's flag

Military

Municipalities and Cities

Political flags

Religious flags

Historical

Flag Proposals

Armenian people in other countries

See also
 Flag of Armenia
 Coat of arms of Armenia

References

Lists and galleries of flags
Flags
List